Adoniram Judson "A. J." Gordon (1836–1895) was an American Baptist preacher, writer, composer, and founder of Gordon College and Gordon–Conwell Theological Seminary.

Life
Gordon was born in New Hampton, New Hampshire, on April 19, 1836. His father, Baptist deacon John Calvin Gordon, was a Calvinist named after John Calvin. His mother was Sally Robinson Gordon. A.J. Gordon was named after Adoniram Judson, a Baptist missionary to Burma who had recently completed a Burmese translation of the Bible.

Gordon experienced a Christian conversion at age 15 and thereafter sought to become a pastor. He graduated from Brown University (then a Baptist affiliated school) in 1860 and Newton Theological Institution in 1863. In 1863, he married Maria Hale and became pastor of Jamaica Plain Baptist Church in Roxbury, Massachusetts. In 1869, he became pastor of Clarendon Street Baptist Church in Boston, a fairly affluent church. Under Gordon's leadership, Clarendon Street Church was described as "one of the most spiritual and aggressive in America". The church is no longer in operation. Gordon became a favored speaker in evangelist Dwight L. Moody's Northfield conventions. Every summer Gordon returned to his hometown in New Hampshire and often preached at the Dana Meeting House.

Gordon became suddenly ill with influenza and bronchitis and died at age 59 on February 2, 1895. He is buried in Forest Hills Cemetery. A son, Ernest Barron Gordon, published a biography of his father in 1896, titled Adoniram Judson Gordon, a Biography with Letters and Illustrative Extracts Drawn from Unpublished or Uncollected Sermons and Addresses, which is still in print.

College
In 1889, with the help and backing of Clarendon Street Church, he founded Gordon Bible Institute and served as its first president. His wife, Maria, was secretary and treasurer until 1908. Gordon's school was founded primarily to train missionaries for work in the Congo.

Writings and teachings
Gordon edited two hymn books and wrote the hymn tunes for at least fifteen hymns, including "My Jesus, I Love Thee," a hymn that has been included in nearly every evangelical hymnal published from 1876 to the present time. In his book The Ministry of the Holy Spirit, Gordon wrote, "It seems clear from the Scriptures that it is still the duty and privilege of believers to receive the Holy Spirit by a conscious, definite act of appropriating faith, just as they received Jesus Christ" (see Baptism with the Holy Spirit).

His most remembered work is probably The Ministry of Healing, a highly revered book on divine healing—physical, mental, and spiritual. Gordon located healing in Christ's Atonement, meaning it was universally available through faith in Christ. He prayed for the sick privately, however, and did not integrate healing into his regular church ministry. The Ministry of Healing became a standard work among early Pentecostals.

Published works

 Adoniram Judson Gordon: A Biography
 Congregational Worship
 Ecce Venit: Behold He Cometh
 A Faithful Past; An Expectant Future
 The First Thing in the World, or, The Primacy of Faith
 The Holy Spirit in Missions
 How Christ Came to Church
 In Christ, or, The Believer's Union with His Lord
 Journal of Our Journey
 The Ministry of Healing, or, Miracles of Cure in All Ages
 The Ministry of the Spirit
 The Ministry of Women
 A School of Christ
 Shaping A Heritage
 The Twofold Life, or, Christ's Work for Us and Christ's Work in Us
 Yet Speaking: A Collection of Addresses

Gallery

References

External links

 
 
 A Short Biography of Adonirum Judson Gordon
 A Biography of A. J. Gordon with Letters and Illustrative Extracts Drawn from Unpublished or Uncollected Sermons & Addresses by his son, Ernest Barron Gordon (PDF Extract)

1836 births
1895 deaths
Brown University alumni
Baptist ministers from the United States
American Christian hymnwriters
19th-century American writers
19th-century American musicians
People from South End, Boston
People from New Hampton, New Hampshire
19th-century American clergy